Timothy Neil Viens (born October 10, 1976) is an American professional stock car racing driver and team owner. He competes part-time in the NASCAR Craftsman Truck Series, driving the No. 46 Toyota Tundra for his own team, G2G Racing. He has also competed in the NASCAR Xfinity Series and ARCA Racing Series in the past.

Racing career

ARCA
Viens made his ARCA debut in 2012 at Salem driving the No. 67 Dodge for Carter 2 Motorsports, but finished last in the race as a did not start. Viens did not make any other starts that year or in 2013.

He returned to the team in 2014 for what appeared to be a full season run. He started the season in their No. 97 car, and when he did not qualify for the races at Toledo Speedway and New Jersey Motorsports Park, he moved into the Wayne Peterson Racing No. 06 Chevrolet. After seven races, Viens did not return to C2M and was without a ride until the Peterson team picked him back up for three starts. He ran one race in each of their cars: Chicago in the No. 06, Pocono in the No. 00, and Kansas in the No. 0.

In 2015, Viens returned to run part-time for Wayne Peterson and his team. He made a total of five starts that year, running Nashville, Talladega, both Pocono races, and Kentucky. In those five races, he drove all four Peterson cars at least once: the No. 00, the No. 0, the No. 06, and the No. 08. He did not finish in all of his starts. His most recent ARCA starts came in 2016, where he drove the WPR No. 06 at Daytona and Talladega.

Truck Series
Viens debuted in the Truck Series in 2015. He attempted 4 races in 2015 but failed to qualify for two. He withdrew from the 4th race he attempted in 2015. Viens made only one start in 2015. Viens returned in 2016, attempting 5 races and starting 3. He failed to qualify for one of them and withdrew from one. In 2017, Viens returned to drive the No. 1 truck for TJL Motorsports at Daytona, but failed to qualify. After not making another attempt in 2017, he returned in early with 2018 at Atlanta with Mike Harmon's No. 74, failing to qualify.

After originally announcing an effort with Mike Affarano Motorsports for the 2020 Daytona race, the team's hauler slid off a highway en route to the track and was not able to compete. After failing to qualify for Charlotte and Atlanta, Viens and the No. 03 were supposed to run at Homestead-Miami but the No. 03 failed pre-race inspection and NASCAR forced them to withdraw since the repairs could not be made at the track. After that incident, Viens and Mike Affarano Motorsports parted ways. Viens later joined CMI Motorsports for a part-time Truck schedule beginning at Pocono.

Viens would rejoin CMI Motorsports in 2021, initially stating he was running full time in the No. 83 truck. In his first attempt to qualify in the 2021 season at the NextEra Energy 250 at Daytona, while getting ready for his qualifying run, the driveshaft of his truck fell off the car, and thus Viens could not set a time and failed to qualify. Due to a combination of factors, including his DNQ, NASCAR's qualifying format for races without such sessions, lack of owner's points, and the number of cars entered, Viens DNQ'd again at the BrakeBest Select 159 at the Daytona International Speedway road course.

On May 26, 2021, Viens announced on social media that he would start up a new race team, called G2G Racing, and it would run its first race in 2022. He had purchased Kyle Busch Motorsports trucks the previous week.

Xfinity Series
He made his NASCAR Xfinity Series debut in the 2015 Ford EcoBoost 300 at Homestead-Miami Speedway for Mike Harmon Racing. During the race, he switched the ride with team owner Mike Harmon; as Viens started the race, he was credited with the 33rd-place finish. He returned to Miami three years later with Harmon but failed to make the field.

Later starts with MHR came in 2018, but failed to qualify, but ran other races in 2020, 2021, and 2022.

Personal life
Viens is an alumnus of Glenville State College, where he played college football as a placekicker. Continuing his involvement in football after college, he tried out for the NFL, but was unsuccessful. After the unsuccessful endeavor, Tim would move to Daytona Beach, Florida and play for the Daytona Thunder for a professional arena football league. He later founded the Vermont Bucks indoor football team in 2016 and, when the league in which it was planning to compete suspended operations prior to the Bucks' inaugural season, established the Can-Am Indoor Football League for the 2017 season. The Can-Am league was based around the Bucks, a few traveling teams Viens established such as the Boston Blaze, and established semi-professional football teams. Viens then created the Atlanta Havoc indoor football team for in the American Arena League (AAL), of which he was also a co-founder, and sold the Bucks to a local ownership group to also play in the AAL. The Bucks would end up folding before playing a game in the league and Viens would also step away from his roles in the Havoc and AAL on April 14, 2018.

Motorsports career results

NASCAR
(key) (Bold – Pole position awarded by qualifying time. Italics – Pole position earned by points standings or practice time. * – Most laps led.)

Xfinity Series

Craftsman Truck Series

 Season still in progress 
 Ineligible for series points

ARCA Racing Series
(key) (Bold – Pole position awarded by qualifying time. Italics – Pole position earned by points standings or practice time. * – Most laps led.)

References

External links
 
 Boston Blaze website

Living people
1976 births
NASCAR drivers
ARCA Menards Series drivers
Racing drivers from Vermont
Glenville State Pioneers football players
Players of American football from Vermont
People from South Hero, Vermont
American football placekickers
American football executives